Justice Allen may refer to:

 Charles Allen (jurist), associate justice of the Massachusetts Supreme Judicial Court
 Elisha Hunt Allen, chief justice of the Hawaiian Islands
 Florence E. Allen, associate justice of the Ohio Supreme Court
 Frederic W. Allen, chief justice of the Vermont Supreme Court
 Harry K. Allen, associate justice of the Kansas Supreme Court
 John Allen (Rhode Island), associate justice of the Rhode Island Supreme Court
 John Campbell Allen, associate justice and chief justice of the colonial New Brunswick Supreme Court
 John E. Allen (judge), associate justice of the New Hampshire Supreme Court
 John J. Allen (judge), associate justice of the  Virginia Supreme Court of Appeals
 Stephen Haley Allen, associate justice of the Kansas Supreme Court
 William Allen (Massachusetts judge), judge of the Massachusetts Supreme Judicial Court
 William Allen (loyalist), chief justice of the Supreme Court of Pennsylvania
 William F. Allen (New York politician), associate justice of the New York Court of Appeals 
 William H. H. Allen, associate justice of the New Hampshire Supreme Court
 William Reynolds Allen, associate justice of the North Carolina Supreme Court